The 2022 Anaheim mayoral election was held on November 8, 2022, to elect the next mayor of Anaheim, California. Municipal elections in California were officially nonpartisan; candidates' party affiliations do not appear on the ballot.

One-term mayor Harry Sidhu, who was elected in 2018 with 32.5% of the vote, resigned in May 2022 amid corruption allegations and an investigation by the FBI regarding the sale of Angel Stadium. The office of mayor has since remained vacant, with mayor pro tempore Trevor O'Neil serving in an acting capacity.

Attorney Ashleigh Aitken won the election, becoming the first woman elected mayor of Anaheim.

Candidates

Declared 
 Ashleigh Aitken, attorney and candidate for mayor in 2018
 Lorri Galloway, former city councilwoman and candidate for mayor in 2014 and 2018
 Dick Lopez, water systems operator
 Trevor O'Neil, mayor pro tempore and city councilman

Withdrew 
 Harry Sidhu, former mayor

Endorsements

Polling

Results

Notes 

Partisan clients

References

External links 
Official campaign websites
 Ashleigh Aitken for Mayor
 Lorri Galloway for Mayor
 Trevor O'Neil for Mayor

Anaheim mayoral
Mayoral elections in Anaheim, California
Anaheim